Gonzalo Bertranou (born 31 December 1993) is an Argentine rugby union player. He plays as a scrum-half for the Jaguares in Super Rugby.

Bertranou plays for Los Tordos, in the Torneo del Oeste.

Bertranou is a regular player for Argentina Jaguars, since 2013, being currently their captain. He played at 2015 World Rugby Nations Cup, where Argentina Jaguars was runners-up to Romania.

Bertranou had his first cap for Argentina at the 71-7 win over Paraguay, at 23 May 2015, for the South American Rugby Championship, in Asunción.

References

External links
 Itsrugby.co.uk profile
Gonzalo Bertranou at UAR Official Website (Spanish)

1993 births
Living people
Sportspeople from Mendoza Province
Argentine rugby union players
Argentina international rugby union players
Rugby union scrum-halves
Jaguares (Super Rugby) players
Dragons RFC players